Egidio Calloni (born 1 December 1952 in Busto Arsizio, Province of Varese) is an Italian former football striker, best known for his stint at A.C. Milan.

Career
An Internazionale youth system product, Calloni then moved to Varese and then on loan to Serie C club Verbania. He returned at Varese in 1972, scoring 23 goals in two Serie B seasons, being noted by A.C. Milan. Signed by the rossoneri in 1974, he played four seasons with A.C. Milan as a regular, scoring 31 goals in 101 matches. He became however famous for his several striking mistakes which brought popular journalist Gianni Brera to nickname him "sciagurato Egidio" (Egidio the wretched), after a minor character from Alessandro Manzoni's novel The Betrothed.

He then played with little success with several other Serie A teams, such as Verona and Perugia, being a backup for Paolo Rossi in the latter. He then moved to Serie B club Palermo, scoring 11 goals in 29 matches (including a single match in the 1981–82 season) and being the rosanero topscorer in 1980–81. He then returned to play at Serie A level with Como, failing however to impress, being featured only eight times, and scoring two goals. He retired in 1982, aged 30.

After retirement
Calloni currently works as an agent for a national gelato company of Italy. He was in the news in 2007 after having been involved in a car accident following a cerebral ischemia attack.

Honours

Club
Milan
Coppa Italia winner: 1976–77.

Individual
Serie B Top-scorer: 1973–74.
Coppa Italia Top-scorer: 1976–77 (6 goals, alongside Giorgio Braglia).

References

External links
Career statistics 

1952 births
Living people
People from Busto Arsizio
Italian footballers
Serie A players
Serie B players
Inter Milan players
A.C. Milan players
Hellas Verona F.C. players
A.C. Perugia Calcio players
Palermo F.C. players
Como 1907 players
S.S.D. Varese Calcio players
Association football forwards
Sportspeople from the Province of Varese
Footballers from Lombardy